WDUV (105.5 FM "The Dove") is a commercial radio station licensed to New Port Richey, Florida and serving the Tampa Bay Area.  Owned by Cox Radio, it broadcasts a soft adult contemporary format. It switches to all-Christmas music from mid-November to December 25.  WDUV's studios and offices are located in St. Petersburg.  The transmitter site is off Dartmouth Drive in Holiday.

WDUV has an effective radiated power (ERP) of 33,000 watts.  It broadcasts in the HD Radio hybrid format.  WDUV carries a country music format on its HD2 channel.

History
Initially signing on in October 1963, with a beautiful music format, WDUV was formerly licensed to Bradenton in Manatee County and formerly broadcast at 103.3 FM. The station originally shared the same studio facilities on Tamiami Trail in Bradenton with WBRD (1420 AM), and the Bradenton news bureau of ABC network affiliate WXLT-TV (now WWSB). At the time, all three stations were owned by the same family.

In the early-1990s, WDUV relocated its frequency to 103.5 FM, to improve its coverage area in the Tampa Bay area. By the mid-1990s, WDUV would be acquired by Jacor Broadcasting (since absorbed by Clear Channel Communications), who relocated its studios to St. Petersburg. As recently as 1997, WDUV continued to play about 50% instrumental music and 50% vocals.

On April 5, 1999, at Midnight, WDUV swapped its frequency with classic rock station WTBT, moving from 103.5 to 105.5 FM. However, both frequencies would retain their transmitting locations and cities of license.  After the swap, WDUV became licensed to New Port Richey with transmitting facilities in Holiday, while WTBT, whose transmitter was located in Riverview, became licensed to Bradenton. (WTBT, now WFUS, has since been relicensed to Gulfport.)  While the new WDUV's transmitter is more powerful, it is also further away from the population center of the Tampa-St. Petersburg-Clearwater market than WDUV's former transmitter. Because WDUV is aimed at an older audience, Cox saw more potential gain with WTBT at 103.5.

Shortly after the swap, Clear Channel sold WDUV to its present owner, Cox Radio.

Current programming and format evolution
Currently, the station specializes in playing an oldies-based soft adult contemporary format, described on the air as "Continuous Lite Favorites." Since the early 2000s, the station's music mix has evolved from an "easy listening" format featuring a sprinkling of "adult standards" artists such as Frank Sinatra, Barbra Streisand, and Nat "King" Cole to its current direction of softer hits from chiefly the 1970s to the 1990s with most of the focus on the 1980s.  Artists frequently heard on the station include Prince, Stevie Wonder, Whitney Houston, Billy Joel, Kool and the Gang, Fleetwood Mac, Phil Collins, Madonna, Hall & Oates, Michael Jackson, and The Eagles.

The station's former so-called "super-soft" format featured one or two smooth jazz instrumentals each hour, as a reminder of its past instrumental "beautiful music" format.  With the purge of the "adult standards" artists from the station's playlist and the addition of some more recent and more upbeat songs, the smooth jazz instrumentals were also dropped.  The station rarely plays any song recorded after 2000, to avoid overlapping with co-owned adult contemporary music station WWRM, whose format is more contemporary.

WDUV is owned by Cox Radio, and is one of the highest-rated radio stations in a large United States market. WDUV is consistently number one in Tampa Bay, often with double the listeners of the number two station, according to Nielsen Audio (formerly Arbitron), a noted radio ratings firm.  WDUV's success prompted owner Cox Radio to put the same format on one of its FM stations in Miami, WFEZ.

WDUV's popular morning show, which airs from 6 to 10 a.m., was hosted by radio personality Dick Ring until he left the station on April 27, 2012. The following Monday, Ring, who retired to North Carolina, was replaced by Ann Kelly, the then-afternoon drive host for WWRM. Weekday afternoons, the host is Giselle Andres from 3 to 7 p.m.. The station airs the syndicated Delilah show in the evening.  The rest of the hours are automated and without disk jockeys, which was how WDUV operated during its history as an easy listening station.  Pre-recorded announcements simply tell listeners that they are hearing "105.5 The Dove, WDUV," with little other dialogue.

References

External links

DUV
Classic hits radio stations in the United States
Soft adult contemporary radio stations in the United States
Cox Media Group
Radio stations established in 1963
1963 establishments in Florida